Yinzhou District is the urban district of Tieling City, Liaoning province, People's Republic of China.

Sightseeings

Longshou Mountain Scenic Area
Chai River Reservoir

Education
No.3 Junior High School of Tieling City

No.2 Senior High School of Tieling City

No.4 Senior High School of Tieling City

Administrative divisions
There are seven subdistricts and one township within the district.

Subdistricts:
Hongqi Subdistrict, Gongren Subdistrict, Tongzhong Subdistrict, Chaihe Subdistrict, Tiedong Subdistrict, Tiexi Subdistrict, and Liaohai Subdistrict.

The only township is Longshan Township.

Tieling Economic Development Zone

References

County-level divisions of Liaoning
Tieling